Gabriel Bordinhão Gasparotto (born 9 December 1993) is a Brazilian footballer who plays as a goalkeeper for Figueirense.

Club career
Born in Lucélia, São Paulo, Gasparotto joined Santos FC's youth setup in 2009, aged 16. He was promoted to the main squad in February 2013, being hazed by Neymar.

Late in the month Gasparotto suffered a knee injury, returning to action in April. On 24 September 2013 he renewed his link with the club, until 2016.

On 16 January 2016, Gasparotto extended his link for a further year, and was immediately loaned to Capivariano until the end of 2016 Campeonato Paulista. He made his senior debut on 10 April, starting in a 0–2 away loss against Botafogo-SP, as his side was already relegated.

On 2 March 2017, Gasparotto was loaned to Ferroviária until the end of the 2017 Campeonato Paulista. The following 1 January he moved abroad, signing for Primeira Liga side Arouca as his contract with Santos expired.

International career
On 10 October 2012 Gasparotto was called up to Brazil under-20s for the 2013 South American Youth Football Championship, but was later cut out from the squad. On 20 May 2013 he was called up for that year's Toulon Tournament, appearing in one match.

Career statistics

References

External links
Santos official profile 

1993 births
Living people
Footballers from São Paulo (state)
Brazilian footballers
Association football goalkeepers
Campeonato Brasileiro Série C players
Santos FC players
Capivariano Futebol Clube players
Associação Ferroviária de Esportes players
São Bernardo Futebol Clube players
Grêmio Novorizontino players
Mirassol Futebol Clube players
Figueirense FC players
F.C. Arouca players
Brazil under-20 international footballers
Brazilian expatriate footballers
Brazilian expatriate sportspeople in Portugal
Expatriate footballers in Portugal